The term "Weil algebra" is also sometimes used to mean a finite-dimensional real local Artinian ring.

 
In mathematics, the Weil algebra of a Lie algebra g, introduced by  based on unpublished work of André Weil,  is a differential graded algebra given by the Koszul algebra Λ(g*)⊗S(g*) of its dual g*.

References

 Reprinted in 

Lie algebras